Sur, Iran is a village in Lorestan Province, Iran.

Sur or Sowr in Iran may also refer to:
 Sur, Fars
 Sur, Hamadan
 Sur, Isfahan
 Sur, Darmian, South Khorasan Province
 Sur, Qaen, South Khorasan Province

See also
 Sur (disambiguation)